César Ignacio Pinares Tamayo (born 23 May 1991) is a Chilean footballer who plays for Primera División club Universidad Católica and the Chile national team as a midfielder.

Biography
Born in Santiago de Chile, Pinares started his career at Colo-Colo. In January 2010, he was signed by Serie A club ChievoVerona. He spent  season in Chievo's Primavera under-20 team. On 31 August 2011, he left for Lega Pro Prima Divisione club Triestina. Pinares also wore no. 40 shirt of the first team of Chievo in 2010–11 Serie A.

Pinares had played in 2011 South American Youth Championship.

Career statistics

Club

International goals 
As of match played on 24 June 2021. Scores and results list Chile's goal tally first.

Honours

Club

Colo-Colo
 Primera División (1): 2009 Clausura

Deportes Iquique
 Copa Chile (1): 2013-14

Universidad Católica
 Primera División (2): 2019, 2020
 Supercopa de Chile (1): 2019

Grêmio
 Campeonato Gaúcho (1): 2021

References

External links
 
 

1991 births
Living people
People from Santiago
People from Santiago Province, Chile
People from Santiago Metropolitan Region
Footballers from Santiago
Chilean footballers
Chile international footballers
Chile under-20 international footballers
Chile youth international footballers
Chilean expatriate footballers
Chilean Primera División players
Primera B de Chile players
Serie A players
Football League (Greece) players
UAE Pro League players
Campeonato Brasileiro Série A players
Süper Lig players
Colo-Colo footballers
Deportes Iquique footballers
Unión Española footballers
Club Deportivo Universidad Católica footballers
San Luis de Quillota footballers
Santiago Morning footballers
A.C. ChievoVerona players
U.S. Triestina Calcio 1918 players
Olympiacos Volos F.C. players
Sharjah FC players
Grêmio Foot-Ball Porto Alegrense players
Altay S.K. footballers
2021 Copa América players
Expatriate footballers in Italy
Chilean expatriate sportspeople in Italy
Chilean expatriates in Italy
Expatriate footballers in Greece
Chilean expatriate sportspeople in Greece
Chilean expatriates in Greece
Expatriate footballers in the United Arab Emirates
Chilean expatriate sportspeople in the United Arab Emirates
Expatriate footballers in Brazil
Chilean expatriate sportspeople in Brazil
Chilean expatriates in Brazil
Expatriate footballers in Turkey
Chilean expatriate sportspeople in Turkey
Association football midfielders